Shiv Bhanu Singh Solanki was a leader of Indian National Congress from Madhya Pradesh. He was deputy chief minister in Government of Madhya Pradesh headed by Arjun Singh in 1980. He was elected to Madhya Pradesh Legislative Assembly  from Dhar district.

References

Year of birth missing (living people)
Living people
Deputy Chief Ministers of Madhya Pradesh
Madhya Pradesh MLAs 1980–1985
People from Dhar district
Indian National Congress politicians from Madhya Pradesh